The Law and the Man is a 1928 American silent drama film directed by Scott Pembroke and starring Tom Santschi, Gladys Brockwell and Robert Ellis.

Cast
 Tom Santschi as Dan Creedoon 
 Gladys Brockwell as Margaret Grayson 
 Robert Ellis as Ernest Vane 
 Tom Ricketts as Quintus Newton 
 Florence Turner as Miss Blair 
 James Cain as Jimmy 
 Henry Roquemore as Stanley Hudson

References

Bibliography
 Ken Wlaschin. Silent Mystery and Detective Movies: A Comprehensive Filmography. McFarland, 2009.

External links
 

1928 films
1928 drama films
1920s English-language films
American silent feature films
Silent American drama films
Films directed by Scott Pembroke
American black-and-white films
Rayart Pictures films
1920s American films